Okere is a parliament constituency in Ghana. Daniel Botwe is the member of parliament for the constituency. He was elected  on the ticket of the New Patriotic Party (NPP) and  won a majority of 5,245 votes to become the MP. He succeeded Brandford Kwame Daniel Adu who had represented the constituency in the 4th Republic parliament on the ticket of the New Patriotic Party (NPP).

See also
List of Ghana Parliament constituencies
MPs elected in the Ghanaian parliamentary election, 2008

References

Parliamentary constituencies in the Eastern Region (Ghana)